Jason Neville may refer to:

Jason Neville (taekwondo) in 2009 World Taekwondo Championships – Men's heavyweight
Jason Neville, character in Revolution (TV series)